Commander Cody and His Lost Planet Airmen were an American rock band founded in 1967. The group's leader and co-founder was pianist and vocalist George Frayne IV, alias Commander Cody (born July 19, 1944 in Boise, Idaho, died September 26, 2021 in Saratoga Springs, New York).

The band became known for marathon live shows. Alongside Frayne, the classic lineup was Billy C. Farlow (b. Decatur, Alabama) on vocals and harmonica; John Tichy (b. St. Louis, Missouri) on guitar and vocals; Bill Kirchen (Kirchen was born in Bridgeport, Connecticut, June 29, 1948 but grew up in Ann Arbor, Michigan) on lead guitar; Andy Stein (b. August 31, 1948 in New York City) on saxophone and fiddle; "Buffalo" Bruce Barlow (b. December 3, 1948 in Oxnard, California) on bass guitar; Lance Dickerson (b. October 15, 1948 in Livonia, Michigan, died November 10, 2003, in Fairfax, California) on drums; and Steve "The West Virginia Creeper" Davis (b. July 18, 1946 in Charleston, West Virginia), followed by Bobby Black, on pedal steel guitar.

The Lost Planet Airmen
Commander Cody and His Lost Planet Airmen formed in 1967 in Ann Arbor, Michigan, United States, with Frayne taking the stage name Commander Cody. The band's name was inspired by 1950s film serials featuring the character Commando Cody and from a feature version of an earlier serial, King of the Rocket Men, released under the title Lost Planet Airmen.

After playing for several years in local bars, in 1969 the core members migrated to Berkeley, California and soon got a recording contract with Paramount Records. (About a year later, Commander Cody invited western swing revival group Asleep at the Wheel to relocate to the Bay Area.) The group released their first album in November 1971, Lost in the Ozone, which yielded its best-known hit, a cover version of the 1955 song "Hot Rod Lincoln", which reached the top ten on the Billboard singles chart in early 1972. Shortly thereafter drummer Lance Dickerson, Bruce Barlow, the band's manager and the band's bus driver moved to a ranch in Kenwood, California named "The Casa Felice". Here in the basement of one of the 3 houses is where the band set up a studio and practiced for upcoming tours. The tour bus at the time was a converted Greyhound bus with the name and logo "Commander Cody and His Lost Planet Airmen" painted on the side. For a short time, the bus could be seen parked on the side of Warm Springs Road in Kenwood. The band's 1974 live recording, Live from Deep in the Heart of Texas features cover art of armadillos by Jim Franklin. The band released several moderately successful albums through the first half of the 1970s. Their 1975 album Tales From The Ozone was produced by Hoyt Axton. After appearing in the Roger Corman movie Hollywood Boulevard, Frayne disbanded the group in 1976.

Geoffrey Stokes' 1976 book Star-Making Machinery featured Commander Cody and His Lost Planet Airmen as its primary case study of music industry production and marketing. Stokes relates the difficulties the band had recording its first album for Warner Bros. Records. The label wanted a hit album along the lines of the soft country-rock of The Eagles, but the band was not inclined to change its raw-edged style.  The book also detailed various internal conflicts within the band, some related to the recording process, others not.

Later some unauthorized Lost Planet Airmen recordings were released in Europe and Australia along with previously unreleased LPA tracks and some outtakes from existing Paramount and Warner releases.

Kirchen and Stein went on to have successful musical careers, with Kirchen being acknowledged as one of the preeminent Telecaster players in the world. Stein had a long association with the radio program, A Prairie Home Companion. Tichy had previously earned a Ph.D. from the University of Michigan and became head of the Department of Mechanical, Aerospace and Nuclear Engineering at Rensselaer Polytechnic Institute (RPI) in Troy, New York.

"Hot Rod Lincoln", the band's most famous recording, was voted a Legendary Michigan Song in 2008. The following year Commander Cody And His Lost Planet Airmen were inducted into the Michigan Rock and Roll Legends Hall of Fame.

Members of the original group, excepting Frayne, held a 50th anniversary reunion in the San Francisco Bay area in June 2019.

The band disbanded in 1977, but the name "Commander Cody" survived, being used by Frayne in various iterations in his solo career.

Commander Cody

Retaining his stage name, George Frayne had a subsequent solo career, touring and releasing albums from 1977 on under various names including Commander Cody, the Commander Cody Band, Commander Cody and His Modern Day Airmen, and Commander Cody and His Western Airmen.

Frayne was also a visual artist. He received a bachelor's in design from the University of Michigan in 1966 and a master's in Sculpture and Painting from the Rackham School of Graduate Studies of the University of Michigan in 1968. He taught at University of Michigan and the University of Wisconsin-Oshkosh, and his art was exhibited at numerous shows around the country. He was a student of cinematography, and has a video (Two Triple Cheese Side Order of Fries) in the Museum of Modern Art's permanent video archive. He has assembled many old movies to go with the band's music as shown on his YouTube channel. Some of his paintings are oversized; most are medium-sized acrylics and present pop art images from media sources and historic photos. His book, Art Music and Life was released by Qualibre Publications in 2009 and is a mix of his best work and anecdotal comments and related stories. He still did portraits of famous automobiles for the Saratoga Auto Museum in Saratoga Springs, New York, where he resided in April, 1997.

George's brother Chris Frayne is credited with the cover art for the Lost in the Ozone, Sleazy Roadside Stories, Hot Licks, Cold Steel & Truckers' Favorites, and Country Casanova albums. He shared credit with George for the album cover for Aces High, and designed other album covers in the music industry. Chris Frayne died in 1992 of multiple sclerosis.

On September 26, 2021, George Frayne died in Saratoga Springs, New York; he was 77 years old.

Style and influences

The band's music encompasses country, Western swing, rockabilly, boogie-woogie, blues, jump blues, jazz, progressive country, rhythm and blues, rock and roll and swing. The band was influential on the development of country rock, roots rock, alternative country and Americana.

The band was influenced by the rowdy barroom country of the Ernest Tubb and Ray Price.

Discography

Albums
Commander Cody and His Lost Planet Airmen
Recordings featuring the original Lost Planet Airmen:

Commander Cody
Recordings featuring George Frayne with various other musicians:

Singles

References

Notes

Citations

External links
Official website
Commander Cody at awpi.com
Amsterdam 1976 – live pics
 
 At discogs.com as Commander Cody
 At discogs.com as Commander Cody Band
 The Commander's channel on youtube
 
  Discogs entry for Chris Frayne
 

1967 establishments in Michigan
2021 disestablishments in New York (state)
American country rock groups
Swing revival ensembles
Western swing musical groups
Boogie-woogie musicians
Rockabilly music groups
Rock music groups from Michigan
Music of Ann Arbor, Michigan
Musical groups established in 1967
Musical groups disestablished in 2021
Blind Pig Records artists
Atlantic Records artists
Relix Records artists
Warner Records artists
MCA Records artists
Arista Records artists